Jiamao (Jiamao; also  Tái or  Sāi) is a divergent Kra-Dai language spoken in southern Hainan, China. Jiamao speakers' autonym is 1.

Classification
Jiamao is often classified one of the Hlai languages, which constitute a primary branch of the Kra–Dai language family, but Norquest (2007, 2015) and others note that Jiamao has a non-Hlai substratum.

Graham Thurgood (1992) suggested that Jiamao might have an Austroasiatic substratum. Norquest (2007) identified various lexical items in Jiamao that do not reconstruct to Proto-Hlai and later firmly established it as a non-Hlai language. Hsiu (2018) notes that Jiamao also contains various words borrowed from an unknown, currently extinct Tibeto-Burman branch.

Demographics
In the 1980s, Jiamao was spoken by 50,000 people in central and south-central Hainan, mostly in Jiamao Township (加茂镇) in Baoting Li and Miao Autonomous County. It shares less than half of its lexicon with the Hlai languages.

In Lingshui Li Autonomous County, Jiamao is spoken in Benhao (本号), Nanping (南平), Wenluo (文罗), Zuguan (祖关), Longguang (隆广), and Tianzi (田仔). In Lingshui County, Jiamao is known as Tái (台), and is also known as Sāi (塞) or Jiāwǒ (加我).

There are four Jiamao dialects, namely Jiamao (加茂), Liugong (六弓), Tianzi (田仔), and Qunying (群英).

Jiamao is spoken in the following villages and townships of southern Hainan.
Baoting Li and Miao Autonomous County (保亭黎族苗族自治县)
Jiamao Township (加茂乡)
Liugong Township (六弓乡)
Shiling Town (什玲镇, in Jie 介村 and Shisheng 什胜村 villages)
Lingshui Li Autonomous County (陵水黎族自治县)
Longguang Town (隆广镇)
Benhao Town (本号镇)
Sanya (三亚市)
Haitangwan Town (海棠湾镇, northeastern part: in Longtoucai 龙头菜村, Xiepei 协配村, and Maohou 毛喉村 villages)

The Liaoergong (廖二弓) dialect is documented in Huang (2011).

See also
Jiamao vocabulary lists (Wiktionary)

References

Works cited

Further reading

 
 
 

Kra–Dai languages
Unclassified languages of Asia
Languages of China
Li people